Sultan Ahmad Shah Bridge or Temerloh Bridge is the main bridge on Pahang River near Temerloh, Pahang, Malaysia. The 575 m bridge is located at Federal route Federal Route 2.

History

In 1971, the old Temerloh Bridge spanning across the Pahang River collapsed due to a massive flood in Temerloh. As a result, the Public Works Department (JKR) constructed a 575-m replacement bridge known as the Sultan Ahmad Shah Bridge FT2 beside the old bridge. The Sultan Ahmad Shah Bridge is much higher than the old bridge, forming the first grade-separated interchange in Pahang that  links to the Federal Route 10. The new bridge also links to a new road that bypasses  Temerloh and Mentakab townships, causing the former Temerloh-Mentakab section to be re-gazetted as the Federal Route 87. The construction of the Sultan Ahmad Shah Bridge was completed in 1974.

References

See also
Sultan Ahmad Shah II Bridge (Semantan Bridge)
Sultan Ahmad Shah III Bridge (Chenor Bridge)

Bridges completed in 1975
Bridges in Pahang